Abdallah was the first Isma'ili missionary in Gujarat. 

He was sent from Yemen to came to Cambay (Khambat), Gujarat in India in about 1067 AD (460AH). Syedi Nuruddin was his companion who also visited Imam Al-Mustansir Billah, Egypt. He joined the Ismaili faith under Fatimid Dai Mu'ayyad fi'l-Din al-Shirazi, and came back to Khambat, India to propagate the Taiyabi faith. His earlier name was Balam Nath.

He is said to have stayed some years at Cambay studying the people. He died on August 12, 1141 in Khambhat, Gujarat, India and his mausoleum is located there. 

The da'i named Ahmad once took two the Gujarati orphans (Abdullah and Nuruddin) to Cairo, trained them in the Ismaili doctrine, and sent them back to Gujarat as missionary. Abdullah laid the foundation of the Bohra community. According to the Bohra myths, Jayasimha sent an army to capture Abdullah, but Abdullah converted him to Islam by performing miracles and by exposing the purported miracles of Hindu pandits as fake. There is no evidence that Jayasimha ever gave up Shaivism, but several of the Bohra Walis and Da'i al-Mutlaqs claimed descent from him. These included Syedna Ismail, the 34th Da'i al-Mutlaq.

Two stories are told of his first missionary success. According to one story, he gained a cultivator's heart by filling his dry well with water. As per second he  travelled to Ahlinvada, Patan. King Sidhraj Jaisingh sent a force of armed men to fetch him, found surrounded with wall of fire. King himself went there to meet him. Later on two of his minister Tarmal and Bharmal became his follower.

Syedi Hasan Feer, 14th century famous saint at Sultan of Patan  was also from the lineage of Maulaya Abdullah.

References

Sources
 
 

11th-century Arabs
12th-century Arabs
11th-century Ismailis
12th-century Ismailis
Ismaili da'is
Musta'li Isma'ilism
Indian Muslims
Islam_in_India
History of Gujarat